Robert Davies (10 December 1876 – 9 September 1916) was a British sports shooter. He competed in two events at the 1912 Summer Olympics. He was killed in action during World War I.

See also
 List of Olympians killed in World War I

References

1876 births
1916 deaths
British male sport shooters
Olympic shooters of Great Britain
Shooters at the 1912 Summer Olympics
Sportspeople from London
British military personnel killed in World War I